

History
Studio Tram Tour: Behind the Magic was an attraction at Walt Disney Studios Park, Disneyland Paris. The attraction premiered with the grand opening of Walt Disney Studios Park on March 16, 2002. The attraction closed on the 5th of January 2020, to be replaced by a new Cars themed attraction and make way for the 2 billion euro multi-year expansion plan at Walt Disney Studios Park.

Guests enter the attraction via the Hollywood Boulevard section of the park, under a false façade of the Hollywood sign. The tram ride portion of the attraction features highlights such as the Catastrophe Canyon scene and a look into the set of London in ruins from the film Reign of Fire. Imagineers wanted to create a studio tour at the Walt Disney Studios Park, similar to the former Studio Backlot Tour at Disney's Hollywood Studios in Florida, where the tour was once the park's signature attraction. The bilingual video that accompanies the tour features Jeremy Irons and Irène Jacob. 

The site of the ride will be used for the upcoming Star Wars  and Frozen area expansions to the 'Walt Disney Studios Park', as announced by Bob Iger in February 2018.

As part of the park's major expansion, much of the Tram Tour was removed for the new lands. Catastrophe Canyon was retained and incorporated into a new abridged Cars-based attraction, Cars Road Trip.

Closure
The attraction's last operating day was January 5, 2020; the ride then closed January 6. On October 14, 2019, it was announced that Cars Route 66 would replace the attraction. The majority of the attraction has been demolished with a small portion, including Catastrophe Canyon having been re-themed around Cars.

References

See also
Studio Backlot Tour (former counterpart tram tour at Disney's Hollywood Studios, Walt Disney World)

Amusement rides introduced in 2002
Amusement rides that closed in 2020
Former Walt Disney Parks and Resorts attractions
Walt Disney Studios Park
Production Courtyard (Walt Disney Studios Park)
2002 establishments in France
2020 disestablishments in France
Backlot sets